Bonów ,  (1945-1950: Banów) is a village in the administrative district of Gmina Bytom Odrzański, within Nowa Sól County, Lubusz Voivodeship, in western Poland.

The village has an approximate population of 70.

References

Villages in Nowa Sól County